Cliff Foenander was a Sri Lankan musician who performed in South East Asia and Las Vegas. Cliff died 21 November 2000.

Career
Cliff grew up in Colombo, and in the 1950s he started performing in clubs and dances around Ceylon.

South Asia's oldest radio station, Radio Ceylon (now the Sri Lanka Broadcasting Corporation) gave Cliff his first exposure inside Ceylon and across South Asia, including India. Broadcasters Vernon Corea, Jimmy Bharucha and Tim Horshington played his songs and interviewed him on their radio shows.

Cliff later joined Hong Kong based group 'The Fabulous Echoes.' and they built a fan base in Hong Kong, the Philippines, Malaysia, Singapore, Indonesia and Japan. The Fabulous Echoes gained international exposure playing in Las Vegas in the United States of America, also performing with rat pack members Frank Sinatra, Dean Martin and Sammy Davis Jr, with Ella Fitzgerald and the great 'Satchmo,' Louis Armstrong. The Fabulous Echoes performed on The Ed Sullivan Show after Ed saw them in action in the Thunderbird Lounge.

Cliff Foenander continued his music career after The Fabulous Echoes. He settled in Melbourne, Australia. Foenander died in Australia on 21 November 2000.

It was during his time in Australia that his voice really matured and he was a regular entertainer at many of entertainment spots in Melbourne and also elsewhere in Australia.  He was the lead singer in a number of prominent Australian bands.  At this time there were also a large number of Sri Lankan migrants in Australia and Cliff being a headliner was always in demand for any of the dinner dances and parties.

Family
Cliff's nephew, Robin Foenander performs in Australia and has released several CDs and a country music song 'Further Down The Road' with the folk music artist Keith Potger, who was a founder member of the Seekers and the New Seekers.

See also
Sri Lanka Broadcasting Corporation
Radio Ceylon
Vernon Corea
List of Sri Lankan musicians

References

External links
 World Music Central: Robin Foenander and Keith Potger release Further Down The Road in Australia
 Top40-charts.com Further Down The Road with Rob Foenander and Keith Potger
 J.R.Ransom's taomusic.com: Robin Foenander and Keith Potger Further Down The Road
 

2000 deaths
Burgher musicians
Sri Lankan emigrants to Australia
20th-century Sri Lankan male singers
Sri Lankan songwriters
Year of birth missing